Bolong may refer to:

 Bolong, a genus of iguanodontian dinosaur
 Bolong, New South Wales, Australia; a locality
 Bolong River, New South Wales, Australia; a river
 Bolong, Zamboanga, Philippines; a former town that was merged into Zamboanga City

See also

Bulong (disambiguation)

Disambiguation pages